Gösta Lundqvist (March 24, 1894 – June 30, 1967) was a Swedish geologist. Lundqvist's research was mainly focused on the Quaternary soils, but he was also a pioneer in limnology.

Biography
Adolf Gösta Lundqvist was born in Hedvig Eleonora parish in Stockholm, Sweden. Lundqvist received his geological training under  Quaternary geologist, Gerard De Geer  and state geologist Lennart von Post (1884–1951).  Lundqvist studied at Stockholm University, where he  received a bachelor of philosophy in 1917, licentiate in philosophy in 1919 and  doctor of philosophy in 1925.  He was active in the Swedish Geological Survey   as the first state geologist 1920–1961 and was named professor in 1957. He was elected a member of the Royal Swedish Academy of Sciences in 1951.

Personal life
From 1924 he was married to Disa Rydeman (1897–1989).
He was the father of two sons who became geologists: Jan Lundqvist and Thomas Lundqvist.

References

External links
Geological Survey of Sweden   website 

1894 births
1967 deaths
Scientists from Stockholm
Geological Survey of Sweden personnel
20th-century Swedish geologists
Swedish limnologists
Stockholm University alumni
Members of the Royal Swedish Academy of Sciences